Michele Somma (born 16 March 1995) is an Italian footballer who plays as a central defender for  club Catania.

Club career
Somma joined Brescia Calcio in a temporary deal on 10 July 2015. On 1 February 2016, Roma signed Ismail H'Maidat from Brescia for €3.15 million, with Somma (for €1.8 million) and Emanuele Ndoj (for €1.2 million) moved to opposite direction.

In August 2018 he signed for Deportivo La Coruña in Spain, playing two seasons in the Segunda División league. He left Spain for Serie C club Palermo in the summer of 2020.

On 1 September 2022, Palermo announced to have terminated Somma's contracted by mutual consent. A few days later, Somma signed for Serie D regional rivals Catania on a free transfer.

International career
Somma has represented Italy from under-16 to under-20 level. He featured in their 2014 UEFA European Under-19 Championship qualifying campaign.

On 12 August 2015, he made his debut with Italy U21 side, in a friendly match against Hungary.

Career statistics

Club

Personal life
He is the son of football coach Mario Somma.

References

External links
 Footballdatabase.eu
 

1995 births
Living people
People from Salerno
Sportspeople from the Province of Salerno
Italian footballers
Italy under-21 international footballers
Italy youth international footballers
Association football defenders
Juventus F.C. players
A.S. Roma players
Empoli F.C. players
Brescia Calcio players
Palermo F.C. players
Catania S.S.D. players
Serie A players
Serie B players
Deportivo de La Coruña players
Italian expatriate footballers
Italian expatriate sportspeople in Spain
Expatriate footballers in Spain
Footballers from Campania